Joseph James Dante Jr. (born November 28, 1946) is an American film director, producer, editor and actor. His films—notably Gremlins (1984) alongside its sequel, Gremlins 2: The New Batch (1990)—often mix 1950s-style B movies with cartoon comedy.

Dante's films also include Piranha (1978), The Howling (1981), Explorers (1985), Innerspace (1987),  The 'Burbs (1989), Matinee (1993), Small Soldiers (1998), and Looney Tunes: Back in Action (2003). His work for television and cable includes immigration satire The Second Civil War (1997) and episodes of anthology series Masters of Horror ("Homecoming" and "The Screwfly Solution") and Amazing Stories, as well as Police Squad! and Hawaii Five-0.

Early life
Dante was born in Morristown, New Jersey, and grew up in nearby Livingston. His father, Joseph James Dante, was a professional golfer, though Dante was more interested in becoming a cartoonist.

Career

1960s
Dante began his film career working for legendary, low-budget producer Roger Corman, who provided similar opportunities to future directors Francis Ford Coppola and James Cameron. In 1968, he made The Movie Orgy, a 7-hour compilation of film clips, commercials and film trailers assembled by Dante.

1970s
He then worked as an editor on Grand Theft Auto after co-directing Hollywood Boulevard with Allan Arkush. His next feature film, the Roger Corman-produced Piranha, was released in 1978 inspired by Steven Spielberg's Jaws. In 1979, Dante helped direct Rock 'n' Roll High School when Allan Arkush fell ill due to exhaustion, but remains uncredited as a director.

1980s
Dante enlisted John Sayles to rewrite the script for the werewolf tale The Howling, loosely based on the novel by Gary Brandner. Dante directed episodes of television series Police Squad!, before Steven Spielberg invited him to join the directing team on anthology movie Twilight Zone: The Movie. Dante's segment, "It's a Good Life", featured cartoon-style special effects, and revolved around a woman played by Kathleen Quinlan who is 'adopted' by an omnipotent boy. His next film, Gremlins proved to be one of Dante's biggest hits to date, being the third-highest-grossing film of 1984. Combining horror and comedy elements, the film revolves around Billy Peltzer (Zach Galligan), who is given a strange creature he calls Gizmo as a pet. After Billy fails to follow the rules for looking after Gizmo, the creature spawns other creatures, which transform into destructive monsters who then begin rampaging through the local town. Dante next directed Explorers, about a group of friends who build a working spacecraft and encounter extraterrestrial life. The film marked the debuts of both River Phoenix and Ethan Hawke. In 1987, Dante made the comedy adventure Innerspace, in which Dennis Quaid's character is miniaturised and injected inside a human body. In 1989, Dante directed Tom Hanks in The 'Burbs, a black comedy in which Hanks' character deals with nightmarish neighbors.

1990s
In 1990, Dante directed a sequel to his film Gremlins, this time set in a New York high rise. In 1993, he directed Matinee, which received positive reviews. Set during the 1960s, the film pays homage to B movies and the showmen who made and promoted them. In his review for the Chicago Reader, Jonathan Rosenbaum wrote, "At the same time that Dante has a field day brutally satirizing our desire to scare ourselves and others, he also re-creates early-60s clichés with a relish and a feeling for detail that come very close to love". USA Today reviewer Mike Clark wrote "Part spoof, part nostalgia trip and part primer in exploitation-pic ballyhoo, Matinee is a sweetly resonant little movie-lovers' movie". Dante was creative consultant on short-lived fantasy series Eerie, Indiana (1991–1992), and directed five episodes.  He played himself in the series finale. In the mid-90s, he worked on The Phantom. When he was removed from the film, he chose screen credit as executive producer rather than pay. In 1998, he directed Small Soldiers which received mixed reviews and was a moderate box office success.

2000s
Dante directed the 2003 live-action/animation hybrid, Looney Tunes: Back in Action. A box office bomb, the film received mixed reviews. In 2007, Dante launched the web series Trailers from Hell, which provides commentary by directors, producers and screenwriters on trailers for classic and cult movies. He is also a contributor to the website. Dante's 2009 film The Hole received positive reviews, and was awarded the Premio Persol at the 2009 Venice Film Festival. The new award was for the "3-D feature deemed the most creative among those produced globally between September 2008 and August 2009." With Roger Corman producing, Dante also directed the interactive web series Splatter for Netflix. The series stars Corey Feldman as a rock star seeking revenge on those he thinks have wronged him.

2010s
In 2014, Dante made Burying the Ex, a horror comedy about a young man whose controlling girlfriend suddenly dies in a freak accident but when he tries to move on with his life along with his new partner he discovers that his now undead Ex has come back. The film stars Anton Yelchin and Ashley Greene. It was selected to be screened out of competition at the 71st Venice International Film Festival, and was released in 2015. Dante served as executive producer on the independent feature length thriller Dark, starring Whitney Able and Alexandra Breckenridge, directed by Nick Basile. The film is set in New York City during the 2003 blackout. The film was released by Screen Media Films on June 7, 2016. In 2018, Dante directed a segment of Nightmare Cinema, a horror anthology film starring Mickey Rourke and featuring shorts also directed by Alejandro Brugués, Mick Garris, Ryūhei Kitamura, and David Slade.

2020s
In 2020, it was announced that Dante would be returning to the world of Gremlins serving as a consultant on the HBO Max prequel series Gremlins: Secrets of the Mogwai.

Frequent collaborators
Like most directors, Dante has developed a stock company of actors who have worked with him over a long period of time.

Dante's long-time friend and business associate, Sylvia, played one of the nuns at the concert in Allan Arkush's Rock 'n' Roll High School. Dante co-wrote and directed five scenes of the film when Arkush became ill.

Filmmaking style and influences
Dante's films are well known for their many references to other movies and for their special effects. Dante's garage is frequently mentioned in audio commentaries as holding many of the props from his various films, including the Peltzer Peeler Juicer from Gremlins, and where the mock-pornographic scene in The Howling was shot.

His respect for the screenwriter extends to the point where, in order to make sure Dante can confer with the writer on-set and provide some minor, additional remuneration, he always casts the writer in a small part of the production itself. The studio is normally unwilling to pay to have the writer on-set in any other way.

Dante has cited among his major influences Roger Corman, Chuck Jones, Frank Tashlin, James Whale and Jean Cocteau, as well as an admiration for the film Hellzapoppin', from which he frequently borrows jokes because of how difficult the film is to see in the United States.

Archive
The moving image collection of Joe Dante and Jon Davison is held at the Academy Film Archive. The joint collection includes feature films, pre-production elements, and theatrical trailer reels.

Filmography

Film

Film segments

Television

Other roles

Miscellaneous

Documentary appearances
 Nightmares in Red, White and Blue (2009)
 In Search of Darkness (2019)
 Love, Antosha (2019)
 In Search of Darkness: Part II (2020)
 Boris Karloff: The Man Behind the Monster (2021)
 In Search of Tomorrow (2022)

Notes

References

Further reading 
 Nil Baskar, Gabe Klinger (Ed.): Joe Dante, FilmmuseumSynemaPublikationen Vol. 19, Vienna: SYNEMA - Gesellschaft für Film und Medien, 2013,

External links

 Interview with Joe Dante, Part 1, MUBI
 Interview with Joe Dante, Part 2, MUBI
 
 
Interview with Joe Dante from the Texas Archive of the Moving Image

1946 births
Living people
People from Livingston, New Jersey
Collage filmmakers
People from Morristown, New Jersey
Film producers from New Jersey
American television directors
Horror film directors
Science fiction film directors
Film directors from New Jersey
Television producers from New Jersey
Postmodernist filmmakers
Comedy film directors